Drupadia ravindra, common name common posy, is a butterfly in the family Lycaenidae.

Subspecies
 Drupadia ravindra ravindra - Java, Lombok
 Drupadia ravindra moorei (Distant, 1882) - S.Thailand, Peninsular Malaya, Singapore, Langkawi, NE.Sumatra, Borneo
 Drupadia ravindra boisduvalii Moore, 1884 - Burma, Mergui, N.Thailand, Indo China
 Drupadia ravindra caesarea Weymer, 1887 - Nias 
 Drupadia ravindra ravindrina (Staudinger, 1889) - Palawan
 Drupadia ravindra joloana (Staudinger, 1889) - Philippines (Jolo, Sulu)
 Drupadia ravindra fulminans (Staudinger, 1889) – Borneo
 Drupadia ravindra surindra (Druce, 1895) - Borneo (Kina Balu, Sandakan)
 Drupadia ravindra esla (Swinhoe, 1912) - Sumatra (W.Barisan Mts.) 
 Drupadia ravindra serunica (van Eecke, 1914) - Simeulue Is. 
 Drupadia ravindra balina (Fruhstorfer, 1914) – Bali
 Drupadia ravindra sumptuosa (Toxopeus, 1931) - W.Sumatra (Lebong Tandai, Bengkulu)
 Drupadia ravindra connexa (Riley, 1945)
 Drupadia ravindra batuna (Riley, 1945) - Batu Is. 
 Drupadia ravindra janus (Riley, 1945) - SW.Sumatra
 Drupadia ravindra banka (Riley, 1945)
 Drupadia ravindra corbeti Cowan, 1974 - S.Vietnam (Pulau Condor)
 Drupadia ravindra resoluta Cowan, 1974 - Philippines (Luzon, Mindoro)
 Drupadia ravindra caerulea Okubo, 1983 
 Drupadia ravindra balabacola Schröder & Treadaway, 1990 
 Drupadia ravindra okurai M. & T. Okano, 1991

Description
On the upperside the forewings of males are dark brown, while the hindwings are metallic blue. The females lack the metallic sheen. The underside of the hindwings of these butterflies show a pattern of black markings on a white background, while the forewings are orange. On the hindwings there are long tails.

Larvae feed on Derris scandens (Papilionaceae) and Saraca thaipingensis.

Distribution and habitat
This species can be found in South Eastern Asia (mainly in Thailand, Peninsular Malaya, Singapore, Java, Sumatra, Borneo, Bali and Philippines.

Bibliography
 LepIndex: The Global Lepidoptera Names Index. Beccaloni G.W., Scoble M.J., Robinson G.S. & Pitkin B., 2005-06-15

References

External links

ravindra
Butterflies described in 1829
Butterflies of Indochina